"I Can Dream" is a song by British rock band Skunk Anansie, released as their second single in June 1995. The song was taken from their debut album, Paranoid & Sunburnt (1995), and reached number 41 on the UK Singles Chart. The CD single features two B-sides and a live recording of "Little Baby Swastikkka".

Music video
The black-and-white music video was directed by production team Gob TV, who directed the video for "Selling Jesus".

Track listings
UK CD single
 "I Can Dream" – 3:39
 "Aesthetic Anarchist" – 2:56
 "Black Skin Sexuality" – 5:52
 "Little Baby Swastikkka" – 4:08

UK 10-inch and cassette single
 "I Can Dream" – 3:39
 "Aesthetic Anarchist" – 2:56
 "Black Skin Sexuality" – 5:52

Charts

References

Skunk Anansie songs
1995 singles
1995 songs
One Little Indian Records singles
Songs written by Skin (musician)
Songs written by Len Arran